Kahriz-e Hajji Morad Khan (also Romanized as Kahrīz-e Ḩājjī Morād Khān; also known as Kahrīz) is a village in Kivanat Rural District, Kolyai District, Sonqor County, Kermanshah Province, Iran. At the 2006 census, its population was 97, in 26 families.

References 

Populated places in Sonqor County